(KOF 2003, or KOF '03), also known by fans as , is a fighting game produced by SNK Playmore for the Neo Geo arcade and home platforms in 2003. It is the tenth game in The King of Fighters series and the last one released for the Neo Geo, which served as the primary platform for the series since The King of Fighters '94. It was ported to the PlayStation 2 and Xbox (in North America and Japan only and it was not compatible with the Xbox 360), and was released in North America as a two-in-one bundle with the preceding game in the series, The King of Fighters 2002.

The game uses a 3-on-3 Tag Battle format in which players can change characters in the middle of a fight. Each team has one leader with access to a Leader Super Special Move. The narrative of the game involves a new tournament set by "R" with two parallel bosses serving as final bosses. The game is notable for starting the story arc of newcomer Ash Crimson, with the story arc itself titled the "Tales of Ash". Falcoon worked as the main illustrator. Critical reception to this game has been mixed due to the major change of the regular gameplay associated with the series.

Gameplay

The 3-on-3 Team Battle format is used once again, just like in past editions. It also uses a Multi-Shift format that allows players to change characters in the middle of a fight. When the "Change OK" sign is displayed above the Power Gauge, the player can do a Quick Shift and change characters immediately, or perform a Switch-Off Attack against the opponent that will consume one Power Gauge stock.

The game also features a Tactical Leader System, in which one of the members of the team is designated as the Leader. The chosen Leader has access to an exclusive move known as the "Leader Super Special Move" (in addition to the regular "Super Special Moves"). However, this usually requires two Power Gauge stocks to be able to perform it.

As in the last game in the series, the players' Power Gauge can hold up to 3 stocks at the beginning of a match. Unlike the previous game, however, the player starts with a full gauge of three stocks right away. When one team loses one of its members, the maximum capacity of Power Gauge stocks is increased by one, giving the losing team a handicap against the opposing team. In addition, unlike the previous KOF games, each hit only earns the player 100 points.

The King of Fighters 2003's sequel, The King of Fighters XI would go on to use its mechanics in its gameplay.

Plot
Taking place two years after the events of The King of Fighters 2001, a new KOF tournament has been announced, being sponsored by an unknown patron whose identity becomes a matter of public interest in the country. The tournament establishes a new set of rules, including the Multi-Shift System that enables fighters to tag out at any given time and the competition itself, consisting of both veterans and newcomers once again takes place and being shown around the world. The narrative is divided depending on the player's actions against the mid-boss Kusanagi, a clone of the returning veteran Kyo Kusanagi. An alternate path following Kusanagi's defeat has the player facing off against a young man named Adelheid Bernstein who is accompanied by his young sister Rose, with the two of them being the children of the notorious Rugal Bernstein. Once Adelheid is defeated, Rose threatens the winner, only to be stopped by Adelheid who tells her to let them go as they won fairly. Within the true ending path, it is revealed that Kusanagi was created by Chizuru Kagura as an attempt to test the winner. Chizuru and her undead sister Maki soon challenge the player to a boss fight. Following the Kagura sisters' defeat, a woman named Botan reveals herself as the one who had brainwashed Chizuru and that both Botan and her partner Mukai are the true masterminds behind the 2003 tournament, with the latter serving as the true ending final boss. Despite being defeated, Mukai claims success for his unknown superior, having weakened the seal of the ancient demon Orochi and while both Mukai and Botan escape, Ash Crimson attacks a weakened Chizuru and steals the Yata Mirror from her, warning Iori Yagami that he's his next target.

Characters

Ash Team (Hero Team)
Ash Crimson (New Character)
Duo Lon (New Character)
Shen Woo (New Character)

Fatal Fury Team
Terry Bogard
Joe Higashi
Tizoc (New Character)

Art of Fighting Team
Ryo Sakazaki
Robert Garcia
Yuri Sakazaki

Korea Team
Kim Kaphwan
Chang Koehan
Jhun Hoon

Ikari Team
Leona Heidern
Ralf Jones
Clark Still

Outlaw Team
Gato (New Character)
Billy Kane
Ryuji Yamazaki

Women Fighters Team
King
Mai Shiranui
Blue Mary

Benimaru Team (New Japan Team)
Benimaru Nikaido
Shingo Yabuki
Goro Daimon

High School Girls Team (New Psycho Soldier Team)
Athena Asamiya
Hinako Shijou
Malin (New Character)

K′ Team
K′
Maxima
Whip

Three Sacred Treasures Team
Kyo Kusanagi (Single Entry)
Iori Yagami (Single Entry)
Chizuru Kagura (hidden in Arcade and Neo-Geo AES version; True Ending Sub-Boss with Maki Kagura)

Bosses
Kusanagi (hidden in Arcade version; Mid-Boss)
Maki Kagura (NPC in Arcade version; True Ending Sub-Boss with Chizuru Kagura)
Adelheid Bernstein (New Character; Alternate Ending Final Boss)
Mukai (New Character; True Ending Final Boss)

Development
The game was first revealed in Tokyo Game Show 2003, originally planned to be developed on the Atomiswave hardware before settling on the Neo-Geo MVS hardware. In North America the game was released alongside The King of Fighters 2002 for the PlayStation 2 and Xbox. The game was solely released for Switch on February 21, 2019. As the first chapter of a new story arc, Ash was designed as an "attractive evil character", in contrast to previous King of Fighters heroes. Due to Ash's late appearance in The King of Fighters 2003, the staff joked that teammate Shen Woo seemed more like the series' main character than Ash did. The two boss characters, Adelheid and Mukai, had no problems during their designs with the former being the last added to expand the narrative of the series. While Kusanagi was first introduced in The King of Fighters 2002 without a plot focused around him, KOF 2003 gave him the idea of being a clone of Kyo Kusanagi created by Chizuru Kagura while also intending to include his school uniform highly 
popular within Kyo's fans.

The series inspired a manhua with the same name. In China the series was divided into two halves: The King of Fighters 2003 composed of five issues, and The King of Fighters 03: Xenon Zero (拳皇 XENON ZERO) composed of eight issues. The two series were combined for the North American release under the name of The King of Fighters 2003. In July 2004, ComicsOne licensed the series with its first volume tying the release of a new video game and kept publishing it after their transition to DrMaster.

Reception

The game got a 7.1 score by Famitsu. DefunctGames gave it a B+ praising the new gameplay style gave the series a major change. New character Tizoc was noted by Kotaku for appealing South American fans based on him being wrestler. Eurogamer was negative believing, previous SNK fighting game like The King of Fighters 2002 offered a better cast and that the new gameplay system would confuse newcomers. Nevertheless, the reviewer commented that the new Garou: Mark of the Wolves fighters introduced in 2003 would also appeal to players similar to Kotaku. HardcoreGaming101 believed the new gameplay features, cast and artwork were interesting but the sequel, The King of Fighters XI, easily fixed most of its issues.

Notes

References

External links 
 
 The King of Fighters 2003 at GameFAQs
 The King of Fighters 2003 at Giant Bomb
 The King of Fighters 2003 at Killer List of Videogames
 The King of Fighters 2003 at MobyGames
 The King of Fighters 2002/2003 at MobyGames

2003 video games
2D fighting games
ACA Neo Geo games
Arcade video games
Fighting games
Fighting games used at the Super Battle Opera tournament
Multiplayer and single-player video games
Neo Geo games
Nintendo Switch games
PlayStation 2 games
PlayStation Network games
PlayStation 4 games
SNK Playmore games
Tag team videogames
The King of Fighters games
Video games developed in Japan
Video games scored by Masahiko Hataya
Video games set in China
Video games set in Egypt
Video games set in Japan
Video games set in Korea
Video games set in Mexico
Video games set in New Zealand
Video games set in the Czech Republic
Xbox games
Xbox One games
UTV Ignition Games games
Hamster Corporation games